The Park Avenue Apartment District is a historic district in Omaha, Nebraska that was listed on the National Register of Historic Places in 2008.

One component, the Portland, was built as the Barnard Apartment Building in 1902, and has been known as the Portland since 1917.  It was designed by architect John Latenser, Sr. and is a three-story apartment building with three wings, forming a U-shape around a courtyard.  It includes Italian Renaissance styling.

The Unitah, built two years later by the same owner and also with Latenser as architect, includes Prairie School design elements in its exterior.  It was later renamed to be the Cantebury Square Apartments.

References

National Register of Historic Places in Omaha, Nebraska
Buildings and structures in Omaha, Nebraska
Historic districts on the National Register of Historic Places in Nebraska
Prairie School architecture in Nebraska
Residential buildings on the National Register of Historic Places in Nebraska